Andrew McPherson (born 20 June 1999) is an Australian rules footballer who plays for the Adelaide Football Club in the Australian Football League (AFL). He was recruited by the Adelaide Football Club with the 40th draft pick in the 2017 AFL draft.

Early Football
McPherson played junior football for Port District in the MWJFL. He played all his school football for Christian Brothers College. McPherson also played football for the Port Adelaide Football Club before being rezoned to the Woodville-West Torrens Football Club in the South Australian National Football League, before getting selected by Adelaide.

AFL career
McPherson debuted for Adelaide in Round 6 of the 2020 AFL season, where his team lost to West Coast by 33 points. McPherson picked up 9 disposals and 5 marks on his debut. He signed a two-year contract extension in March 2021.

Statistics
Statistics are correct to round 2, 2021

|- style="background-color: #eaeaea"
! scope="row" style="text-align:center" | 2018
|  || 36 || 0 || — || — || — || — || — || — || — || — || — || — || — || — || — || —
|-
! scope="row" style="text-align:center" | 2019
|  || 36 || 0 || — || — || — || — || — || — || — || — || — || — || — || — || — || —
|- style="background:#EAEAEA"
| scope="row" text-align:center | 2020
| 
| 36 || 9 || 0 || 0 || 56 || 58 || 114 || 25 || 15 || 0.0 || 0.0 || 6.2 || 6.4 || 12.7 || 2.8 || 1.7
|-
! scope="row" style="text-align:center" | 2021
|  || 36 || 2 || 0 || 0 || 10 || 6 || 16 || 4 || 5 || 0.0 || 0.0 || 5.0 || 3.0 || 8.0 || 2.0 || 2.5
|- style="background:#EAEAEA; font-weight:bold; width:2em"
| scope="row" text-align:center class="sortbottom" colspan=3 | Career
| 11
| 0
| 0
| 66
| 64
| 130
| 29
| 20
| 0.0
| 0.0
| 6.0
| 5.8
| 11.8
| 2.6
| 1.8
|}

References

1999 births
Living people
Australian rules footballers from Adelaide